Harold Wood railway station is on the Great Eastern Main Line in east London, serving the Harold Wood area of Romford in the London Borough of Havering. It is  down the line from London Liverpool Street and is situated between Gidea Park and Brentwood. Its three-letter station code is HRO and it is in Travelcard zone 6.

History
Goods facilities consisted of two sidings on the north side of the line opposite the up platform, and there was also a long siding serving a brickworks. A signal box was provided at the up end of the down platform controlling the signals, access to the goods facilities, and a trailing crossover.

Two additional tracks were built to the north of the original lines in 1934 under London and North Eastern Railway ownership. The original tracks are normally used today by express services which do not call at Harold Wood. At this time the current station building was constructed on the overbridge at Gubbins Lane, and new platforms of precast concrete construction located slightly further east nearer to the new station building. The signal box was removed as part of these works, with control of the new colour light signals shared between Gidea Park and Brentwood.

Services
The typical Monday-Saturday off-peak service from the station is eight trains per hour to Shenfield and eight to Paddington. On Sundays this reduces to six in each direction.

Connections
London Buses routes 256, 294, 347, 496, 497, 646 and 656 serve the station.

References

External links

 Excel file displaying National Rail station usage information for 2005/06 

Railway stations in the London Borough of Havering
Former Great Eastern Railway stations
Railway stations in Great Britain opened in 1868
Railway stations served by the Elizabeth line